The Tunisian national futsal team, nicknamed Les Aigles de Carthage (The Eagles of Carthage or The Carthage Eagles), represents Tunisia in international futsal competitions. It is affiliated to the Tunisian Football Federation.

Tournament records
 Champions   Runners-up   Third place   Fourth place  

Red border color indicates tournament was held on home soil.

FIFA Futsal World Cup

Africa Futsal Cup of Nations

North African Futsal Tournament

Arab Futsal Championship

Mediterranean Futsal Cup

See also
 Tunisia national football team
 Tunisia national beach soccer team
 Tunisia national minifootball team
 Tunisia national American football team

References

External links
 Official site

African national futsal teams
Futsal
National